Hans Peter Mareus Neilsen Gammel (September 24, 1854 – February 11, 1931) was an  author and bookseller.  He served as editor and publisher of a series of books reporting Texas legislation enacted by each congressional and legislative session. His first publication consisted of 10 volumes and covered 75 years of Texas legal history. The Laws of Texas 1822-1897 has long been a primary resource for the study of Texas legal history during the Nineteenth Century.

Background
Hans Peter Mareus Neilsen Gammel was born  in Grenaa(Grenå), in Region Midtjylland, Aarhus County, Denmark. He was the son of  Niels Hansen Gammel and 
Mittie Marie Brugger.   Looking for a better life, he followed his sister to the United States. Gammel and his brother Niels traveled through the western U.S. peddling jewelry and trinkets, looking for a stake in a gold mine. Gammel  sent for the family, who eventually caught up with him in Austin, Texas.

Career
Gammel rented a little place in Austin and he set up a stand. He sold writing paper, bits of jewelry, lemonade, and books. In 1881, the old Texas State Capitol burned to the ground.   In order to earn a little extra money to help support his growing family, Gammel took the contract to haul away the debris. Gammel gathered papers and charred documents from the debris scattered on the Capitol grounds. He loaded them in a wagon and took them to his home. He and his wife gradually dried the pages on a clotheslines and stored them with their belongings.

Gammel sorted and edited the crinkled papers, then published them beginning in 1898 as the first ten volumes of Gammel’s Laws of Texas, 1822-1897. This work won acclaim and was supplemented by additional volumes after each legislature to bring the set up to date until 1937.

Personal life
Gammel married Anna Marie Andersen in Denmark when he was 16. After Anna's death from typhoid in late 1888, Hans married Swedish-born Josephine Matilda Ledel, who bore him eight children.

Selected works
The Laws of Texas, 1897-1902 Vol 11 -	 (1902)
The Laws of Texas, 1903-1905 Vol 12 -	 (1906)
The Laws of Texas, 1907 Volume 13	 -	 (1907)
The Laws of Texas, 1909-1910 Vol 14 -	 (1910)
The Laws of Texas, 1911 Volume 15	 -	 (1911)
The Laws of Texas, 1913-1914 Vol 16 -	 (1914)
The Laws of Texas, 1917-1918 Vol 18 -	 (1918)
The Laws of Texas, 1919 Volume 19	 -	 (1919)
The Laws of Texas, 1920-1921 Vol 20 -	 (1921)
The Laws of Texas, 1923-1925 Vol 22 -	 (1925)
The Laws of Texas, 1925 Volume 23	 -	 (1925)
The Laws of Texas, 1929-1931 Vol 27 -	 (1931)

References

Primary Source
Bohlender, Dorothy G. and Frances T. McCallum  H. P. N. Gammel, Texas Bookman (Waco, Texas: Texian Press. 1985) 
Davis, John L. The Danish Texans (San Antonio: University of Texas. 1979)

External links
Gammel's Laws of Texas Online at the University of North Texas Libraries' Government Information Connection

1854 births
1931 deaths
Danish emigrants to the United States
Writers from Austin, Texas
American Lutherans
People from Norddjurs Municipality